This is a list of notable events in Latin music (i.e. Spanish- and Portuguese-speaking music from Latin America, Europe, and the United States) that took place in 2005.

Events
May 21In response to the rise of Latin urban music such as reggaeton and Latin hip hop, Billboard establishes the Latin Rhythm Albums chart. Barrio Fino by Daddy Yankee is the album to reach number-one on the chart.
August 27In addition to the newly created Latin Rhythm Albums chart, Billboard launches the Latin Rhythm Airplay chart for reggaeton and Latin hip hop songs. "Lo Que Pasó, Pasó" by Daddy Yankee is the first song to reach number one on the chart on the week-dated August 12, 2005.
November 3 — The 6th Annual Latin Grammy Awards are held at the Shrine Auditorium in Los Angeles, California. It was broadcast in Spanish for the first time after the award ceremony switched from CBS to Univision.
Cantando Historias by Ivan Lins wins the award for Album of the Year, the first Portuguese-language album to do so.
Alejandro Sanz wins the award for Record of the Year and  Song of the Year for "Tu No Tienes Alma".
Bebe wins Best New Artist.

Number-ones albums and singles by country
List of number-one singles of 2005 (Spain)
List of number-one Billboard Top Latin Albums of 2005
List of number-one Billboard Hot Latin Songs of 2005

Awards
2005 Premio Lo Nuestro
2005 Billboard Latin Music Awards
2005 Latin Grammy Awards
2005 Tejano Music Awards

Albums released

First quarter

January

February

March

Second quarter

April

May

June

Third quarter

July

August

September

Fourth quarter

October

November

December

Unknown

Best-selling records

Best-selling albums
The following is a list of the top 10 best-selling Latin albums in the United States in 2005, according to Billboard.

Best-performing songs
The following is a list of the top 10 best-performing Latin songs in the United States in 2005, according to Billboard.

References 

 
Latin music by year